Thiago Pontes Veloso (born 15 August 1993) is a Brazilian professional volleyball player. He competed for Brazil at the 2013 U21 World Championship and the 2015 U23 World Championship. At the professional club level, he plays for Montpellier Volley.

Honours

Youth national team
 2010  CSV U19 South American Championship
 2011  U19 Pan American Cup
 2012  U23 Pan American Cup
 2012  CSV U21 South American Championship
 2013  FIVB U21 World Championship
 2013  FIVB U23 World Championship
 2014  CSV U23 South American Championship

Individual awards
 2011: U19 Pan American Cup – Best Setter
 2012: CSV U21 South American Championship – Best Setter
 2014: CSV U23 South American Championship – Best Setter

References

External links

 
 Player profile at LegaVolley.it 
 Player profile at PlusLiga.pl 
 Player profile at JornaldoVôlei.com.br 
 Player profile at Volleybox.net 
 2013 FIVB U21 World Championship – Team Brazil
 2013 FIVB U23 World Championship – Team Brazil

1993 births
Living people
Brazilian men's volleyball players
Pan American Games medalists in volleyball
Pan American Games silver medalists for Brazil
Pan American Games bronze medalists for Brazil
Volleyball players at the 2015 Pan American Games
Medalists at the 2015 Pan American Games
Volleyball players at the 2019 Pan American Games
Medalists at the 2019 Pan American Games
Brazilian expatriate sportspeople in Italy
Expatriate volleyball players in Italy
Brazilian expatriate sportspeople in France
Expatriate volleyball players in France
Brazilian expatriate sportspeople in Poland
Expatriate volleyball players in Poland
MKS Będzin players
Setters (volleyball)